Yaya Sanou (born 29 December 1993) is a Burkinabé international footballer who plays for Egyptian club Beni Suef, as a defender.

Career
Born in Bobo-Dioulasso, he has played club football for ASF Bobo Dioulasso, ENPPI and Beni Suef.

He made his international debut for Burkina Faso in 2017.

References

1993 births
Living people
Burkinabé footballers
Burkina Faso international footballers
ASF Bobo Dioulasso players
ENPPI SC players
Beni Suef SC players
Egyptian Premier League players
Association football defenders
Burkinabé expatriate footballers
Burkinabé expatriate sportspeople in Egypt
Expatriate footballers in Egypt
21st-century Burkinabé people
Burkina Faso A' international footballers
2018 African Nations Championship players